The 1900 Illinois gubernatorial election was held on November 6, 1900. 

Incumbent Republican Governor John Riley Tanner retired in order to unsuccessfully run for U.S. Senate.

Republican nominee Richard Yates Jr. defeated Democratic nominee Samuel Alschuler with 51.49% of the vote.

Democratic nomination

Candidates
Samuel Alschuler, member of the Illinois General Assembly
Charles K. Ladd, lawyer
Alfred Orendorff, former adjutant general of the Illinois National Guard
Adam Ortseifen, City Treasurer of Chicago
Nicholas E. Worthington, circuit judge, former U.S. Representative

Results
The Democratic state convention was held on June 26 and 27, 1900 at the State Capitol in Springfield.

The results of the balloting were as follows:

Republican nomination

Candidates
Orrin N. Carter, county judge of Cook County
Elbridge Hanecy, circuit court judge of Cook County
Walter Reeves, U.S. Representative for Illinois's 11th congressional district
Richard Yates Jr., United States collector of internal revenue

Results
The Republican state convention was held from May 8, 1900 at Peoria.

The results of the balloting were as follows:

General election

Candidates
Samuel Alschuler, Democratic
Richard Yates Jr., Republican 
Alfred Cheesbrough Van Tine, People's, farmer
Visscher Vare Barnes, Prohibition, candidate for the Illinois's 7th congressional district in 1898
Herman C. Perry, Social Democrat
Louis P. Hoffman, Socialist Labor
Lloyd G. Spencer, Union Reform
John Cordingly, United Christian

Results

See also
1900 Illinois lieutenant gubernatorial election

References

Bibliography

Governor
1900
Illinois
November 1900 events